Professor Emeritus,  Elaine Rush,  MNZM, Professor of Nutrition at Auckland University of Technology,  PhD has been involved in health and education for all her working career.  In 2014 she was appointed as a Member of the New Zealand Order of Merit for services to health and in 2019 was appointed  Professor Emeritus in recognition of long and distinguished service to the University through outstanding research and teaching.

Research 
Her diverse research expertise in the measurement of body composition, energy expenditure, physical activity, nutrition and risk factors for disease, an interest in ethnic differences in health and involvement in programmes and actions that will make a difference to health has across the lifecycle has led to over 170 publications.

The projects she is involved in include Energize in preschools and primary schools reaching more than 60,000 children, the health and growth of children whose mothers’ had gestational diabetes and the longitudinal Pacific Island Family study which is tracking over 1,000 Pacific children from birth.

Positions 
She is the scientific director of the New Zealand Nutrition Foundation. Elaine also serves on the Councils of a number of nutrition and obesity organisations and is the New Zealand representative for the World Obesity Federation. She has been an expert consultant for the World Health Organization and the International Atomic Energy Agency in Nutrition and Health. She is a deputy editor for the British Journal of Nutrition and Adjunct Professor at the Cork Institute of Technology.

References

External links 
 
 Author details (Rush, Elaine) on Scopus

Living people
New Zealand scientists
New Zealand women scientists
Academic staff of the Auckland University of Technology
Year of birth missing (living people)